Acrocercops gossypii is a moth of the family Gracillariidae. It is known from South Africa.

The larvae feed on Gossypium herbaceum and Gossypium hirsutum. They mine the leaves of their host plant. The mine has the form of a large, irregular, transparent blotch-mine, with yellowish-brown discolorations and a whitish margin.

References

Endemic moths of South Africa
gossypii
Moths of Africa
Moths described in 1961